Alexander Sergeyevich Yakovlev (22 August 1989) was a Soviet aeronautical engineer. He designed the Yakovlev military aircraft and founded the Yakovlev Design Bureau. Yakovlev joined the Communist Party of the Soviet Union in 1938.

Biography
Yakovlev was born in Moscow, where his father was an employee of the Nobel Brothers oil company. From 1919 to 1921 he worked as a part-time courier while still in school, and in 1922 he built his first model airplane as part of a school project. In 1924, he built a glider, the AVF-10, which made its first flight on 24 September 1924. The design won an award, and secured him a position as a worker at the Zhukovsky Air Force Military Engineering Academy. However, his repeated attempts to gain admission to the Academy were denied due to his “lack of proletariat origins”. In 1927, Yakovlev designed the AIR-1 ultralight aircraft. This was the first of a series of ten aircraft he designed between 1927 and 1933.

In 1927, Yakovlev finally gained admittance to the Academy, and graduated in 1931. He was then assigned to the Moscow Aviation Plant No. 39, where his first design bureau of lightweight aviation was established in 1932. He became the main designer in 1935, then the chief designer (1956–1984) of aircraft for the Yakovlev Design Bureau.

The Yakovlev Design Bureau developed large numbers of fighter aircraft used by the Soviet Air Force during World War II.  Particularly well known are the Yak-1, Yak-3, Yak-7 and Yak-9 as well as the Yak-6 transport. In 1945 Yakovlev designed one of the first Soviet aircraft with a jet engine, the Yak-15. He also designed the first Soviet  all-weather interceptor, the Yak-25P, and the first Soviet supersonic bomber, the Yak-28. In the post-war period, Yakovlev was best known for the civilian airliner, the Yak-42, a three-engine medium-range aircraft, and numerous models for aerobatics.

Yakovlev served under Joseph Stalin as a Vice-Minister of Aviation Industry between 1940 and 1946. Before the start of World War II, he made a number of trips abroad, including Italy, England and Germany, to study aircraft development in those countries. After the start of the war, he helped supervise the evacuation of aircraft factories to the east, and the organization of production, while continuing as head designer of his Bureau. He was also a correspondent-member of the USSR Academy of Science in 1943. In 1946 he was awarded the title "General-Colonel of Aviation".

In 1976 Yakovlev became academician of the USSR Academy of Science. He was a deputy of the Supreme Soviet of the USSR (1946–1989). Yakovlev retired 21 August 1984. He was buried in the Novodevichy Cemetery in Moscow.

Awards and honors
 Hero of Socialist Labour (1940, 1957)
 Lenin Prize (1972)
 Stalin Prize (1941, 1942, 1943, 1946, 1947, 1948)
 USSR State Prize 1977)
 Order of Lenin (10 times)
 Order of the October Revolution
 Order of the Red Banner (twice)
 Order of Suvorov, 1st and 2nd class,
 Order of the Patriotic War of the 1st class (twice)
 Order of the Red Banner of Labour
 Order of the Red Star
 Legion of Honor, Officer (France)
 Gold medal of the Fédération Aéronautique Internationale

See also 

 List of Russian aerospace engineers
 Sergey Ilyushin
 Andrey Tupolev
 Oleg Antonov

References

Further reading 
Iakovlev, I.A. “Aim of a Lifetime, Story of Alexander Yakovlev, Designer of the YAK Fighter Plane”, Central Publishers, 1972, 

1906 births
1989 deaths
Writers from Moscow
People from Moskovsky Uyezd
Communist Party of the Soviet Union members
Second convocation members of the Supreme Soviet of the Soviet Union
Third convocation members of the Supreme Soviet of the Soviet Union
Fourth convocation members of the Supreme Soviet of the Soviet Union
Fifth convocation members of the Supreme Soviet of the Soviet Union
Sixth convocation members of the Supreme Soviet of the Soviet Union
Seventh convocation members of the Supreme Soviet of the Soviet Union
Eighth convocation members of the Supreme Soviet of the Soviet Union
Ninth convocation members of the Supreme Soviet of the Soviet Union
Tenth convocation members of the Supreme Soviet of the Soviet Union
Eleventh convocation members of the Supreme Soviet of the Soviet Union
Soviet colonel generals
Soviet Air Force generals
Soviet aerospace engineers
Russian aerospace engineers
20th-century Russian engineers
Yakovlev
Full Members of the USSR Academy of Sciences
Heroes of Socialist Labour
Recipients of the USSR State Prize
Stalin Prize winners
Lenin Prize winners
Recipients of the Order of Lenin
Recipients of the Order of Suvorov, 1st class
Officiers of the Légion d'honneur
Recipients of the Order of the Red Banner
Burials at Novodevichy Cemetery